Michael F. McAllister is a United States Coast Guard admiral.

Michael McAllister may also refer to:

Michael McAllister, character in Bad Behaviour
Michael McAllister (Gaelic footballer), Down Minor Football Team 2005
Michael McAllister (writer) of From Boys to Men: Gay Men Write About Growing Up
Mike McAllister, character in The 'Human' Factor
 Michael MacAllister, musician, see Kotringo
Mick McAllister, character in Teenwolf

See also
Michael J. McAlister, special effects